David Costas Cordal (born 26 March 1995) is a Spanish professional footballer who plays as a centre-back for Real Oviedo.

Club career

Celta
Born in Vigo, Galicia, Costas played youth football with hometown's RC Celta de Vigo. On 25 August 2013, only two months after finishing his junior career and without having appeared for the reserves, the 18-year-old made his first-team – and La Liga – debut for the main squad, coming on as a substitute for Augusto Fernández in the 77th minute of a 2–1 away win against Real Betis.

On 31 August 2015, Costas renewed his contract until 2019, being immediately loaned out to RCD Mallorca. On 14 January 2017, he joined fellow second division club Real Oviedo also on loan. He scored his first goal as a professional on 5 February, in the 2–1 home victory over Mallorca which was also his first appearance.

Costas agreed to an extension until 2020 on 31 August 2017, and was then loaned to FC Barcelona Atlètic for one year. He played his first competitive match with the latter's first team on 29 November, replacing Gerard Piqué early into the second half of a 5–0 home defeat of Real Murcia for that season's Copa del Rey.

On 25 January 2020, Costas moved to UD Almería on loan for the remainder of the second-tier campaign. He returned to Celta for 2020–21, but did not play a single minute during the season.

Oviedo
Costas returned to Oviedo on 12 July 2021, on a three-year deal.

Career statistics

Club

Honours
Barcelona
Copa del Rey: 2017–18

References

External links
FC Barcelona official profile

1995 births
Living people
Spanish footballers
Footballers from Vigo
Association football defenders
La Liga players
Segunda División players
Segunda División B players
Celta de Vigo B players
RC Celta de Vigo players
RCD Mallorca players
Real Oviedo players
FC Barcelona Atlètic players
FC Barcelona players
UD Almería players
Spain youth international footballers
Spain under-21 international footballers